The Palais d'York is a historic mansion in Nice, Alpes-Maritimes, France. It was built from 1762 to 1768. It has been listed as an official national monument since December 16, 1949.

References

Houses completed in 1768
Monuments historiques of Nice
1768 establishments in France